Ptilodoninae is a subfamily of the moth family Notodontidae. They are sometimes merged into the Notodontinae.  The genus list is preliminary, as not all Notodontidae have been assigned to subfamilies yet.

Genera 
 Allodonta
 Allodontoides
 Epinotodonta
 Epodonta
 Hagapteryx
 Hexafrenum
 Higena
 Himeropteryx
 Hiradonta
 Hyperaeschrella
 Jurivalentinia
 Lophontosia
 Megaceramis
 Microphalera
 Odontosia
 Odontosina
 Pterostoma
 Ptilodon
 Ptilodontosia
 Ptilophora
 Spatalina
 Togepteryx

Notodontidae
Moth subfamilies